Marxist–Leninist Party may refer to any Marxist–Leninist political party or:

 Marxist–Leninist Party of Austria
 Marxist–Leninist Party of Canada
 Marxist–Leninist Communist Party of Ecuador
 Italian Marxist–Leninist Party
 Marxist–Leninist Party of Germany
 Marxist–Leninist Party of the Netherlands
 Marxist-Leninist Party of Nicaragua
 Marxist–Leninist Party of Quebec
 Marxist-Leninist Party (Communist Reconstruction) (Spain)
 Marxist–Leninist Communist Party (Turkey)
 Marxist–Leninist Party, USA
 Marxist–Leninist Party of Ukraine